Hexacentrus is the type genus of bush-crickets in the subfamily Hexacentrinae. Most species of this genus occur in Southeast Asia and in Africa.

Species
The following are described species of Hexacentrus:

References

Tettigoniidae
Tettigoniidae genera
Orthoptera of Asia